The 2015 Mordovian Ornament is a senior international figure skating competition in the 2015–16 season. A part of the 2015–16 ISU Challenger Series, the 1st edition of the annual event were held on 15–18 October 2015 at the Palace of Sports of the city Saransk, Russia. Medals will be awarded in the disciplines of men's singles, ladies' singles, pair skating, and ice dancing.

Entries
The preliminary entries were published on 25 September 2015.

Results

Men

Ladies

Pairs

Ice dancing

References

2015
2015 in figure skating
2015 in Russian sport